Mohammadabad-e Chah Kavir (also Romanized as Moḩammadābād-e Chāh Kavīr and Moḩammadābād Chāh Kavīr; also known as Chāh-e Kavīr and Chāh Kavīr) is a village in Dastgerdan Rural District, Dastgerdan District, Tabas County, South Khorasan Province, Iran. At the 2006 census, its population was 28, in 6 families.

References 

Populated places in Tabas County